The Dutch Marathon Championships is a speed skating event composed of two championships. One on natural ice and one on artificial ice.

Natural ice
The championship was skated for the first time in 1979. In the next 33 years the championship could be organized only 13 times. The last edition was skated in 2012 at the Grote Rietplas in Emmen. The skating event is held each winter season (if possible) and it is possible for the event to take place twice in the same year.

Dries van Wijhe and Jorrit Bergsma are the only male skaters who have won the championships twice. Alida Pasveer is the only female skater to win twice. One skater, Rudi Groenendal won the veteran's championship three times.

Champions

Source: Schaatsen.nl

Artificial ice
The championship was skated for the first time in 1973. The event is organized every year at an ice rink.

Champions

Source: Schaatsen.nl

References

 www.schaatspeloton.nl Site about marathon speed skating

Dutch Speed Skating Championships
Speed skating in the Netherlands